Campbelltown  Blues Australian Football Club is an Australian rules football club competing in the Sydney AFL and based out of the Sydney suburb of Macquarie Fields, New South Wales.

History
The Campbelltown Australian Football Club formed in 1975.

In 2000, they aligned with the Penrith Panthers to become the Panthers.  In 2002, they became the Campbelltown Kangaroos.  This was later truncated to the Kangaroos.

In 2007, the club reverted to their old name, the "Blues".

Campbelltown players who have been recruited to play AFL football include Chris Oliver (St Kilda 2001–03), Dustin Martin (Richmond 2010- ) and Tom Young (Collingwood 2011–12) and Western Bulldogs (2013- )

References

External links
 
 Full Points Footy Profile for Campbelltown

Australian rules football clubs in Sydney
Australian rules football clubs established in 1975
1975 establishments in Australia